Dell Rapids is a city in Minnehaha County, South Dakota, United States. The population was 3,996 at the 2020 census. It is known as "The Little City with the Big Attractions."

The city took its name from the Dells of the Wisconsin River, which were likened to the local rapids on the Big Sioux River.

History
Dell Rapids was originally named Dell City, but was renamed after the rapids of the Big Sioux River. After a fire broke out on the main street and burned most of the town, it was rebuilt out of Sioux Quartzite, a common rock in the area. The Chicago, Milwaukee, and Saint Paul Railroad built a railroad into the area, reaching Dell Rapids from Egan in 1881. Two large Sioux Quartzite quarries owned by LG Everist are operated via this rail line, which is now operated by LG's subsidiary, the D&I Railroad. The community celebrates its heritage with the annual "Quarry Days" in July, and in June, the city hosts "Cootie Days", where rides and games are set up and available in the city's park.

Geography
Dell Rapids is located at  (43.824883, -96.711158), along the Big Sioux River.

Dell Rapids has the ZIP code 57022 and the FIPS place code 15980.

Demographics

2010 census
At the 2010 census there were 3,633 people, 1,388 households, and 973 families living in the city. The racial makeup of the city was 98.0% White, 0.1% African American, 0.6% Native American, 0.2% Asian, 0.2% from other races, and 0.9% from two or more races. Hispanic or Latino of any race were 1.4%.

Of the 1,388 households 38.3% had children under the age of 18 living with them, 58.8% were married couples living together, 7.8% had a female householder with no husband present, 3.5% had a male householder with no wife present, and 29.9% were non-families. 25.1% of households were one person and 11.4% were one person aged 65 or older. The average household size was 2.58 and the average family size was 3.10.

The median age was 34.8 years. 28.9% of residents were under the age of 18; 6.6% were between the ages of 18 and 24; 27.6% were from 25 to 44; 21.7% were from 45 to 64; and 15% were 65 or older. The gender makeup of the city was 48.7% male and 51.3% female.

2000 census
At the 2000 census, there were 2,980 people, 1,127 households, and 793 families living in the city. The population density was 1,519.9 people per square mile (587.0/km). There were 1,181 housing units at an average density of 602.3 per square mile (232.6/km). The racial makeup of the city was 98.69% White, 0.13% African American, 0.47% Native American, 0.20% Asian, 0.07% from other races, and 0.44% from two or more races. Hispanic or Latino of any race were 0.64% of the population.

Of the 1,127 households 36.7% had children under the age of 18 living with them, 60.5% were married couples living together, 7.2% had a female householder with no husband present, and 29.6% were non-families. 26.0% of households were one person and 13.5% were one person aged 65 or older. The average household size was 2.55 and the average family size was 3.09.

The age distribution was 28.4% under the age of 18, 6.5% from 18 to 24, 27.3% from 25 to 44, 19.4% from 45 to 64, and 18.3% 65 or older. The median age was 36 years. For every 100 females, there were 91.4 males. For every 100 females age 18 and over, there were 90.3 males.

As of 2000 the median income for a household in the city was $42,572, and the median family income was $49,536. Males had a median income of $31,867 versus $24,333 for females. The per capita income for the city was $17,731. About 1.9% of families and 4.0% of the population were below the poverty line, including 2.3% of those under age 18 and 12.7% of those age 65 or over.

Education
Dell Rapids is home to two separate school systems: the Dell Rapids public school system and St. Mary's, a private Catholic parochial school.

The public school system includes Dell Rapids High School, a middle school, and an elementary school. The Public School District's mascot is the Quarriers, named after the large Sioux Quartzite rock quarries that are also in Dell Rapids. St. Mary's school also includes St. Mary High School, a junior high school, and elementary school. The St. Mary School District's mascot is the Cardinals.

Notable people

 Daniel Ahlers, former member of the South Dakota House of Representatives
 Dennis Daugaard, former governor of South Dakota
 Jon Hansen, member of the South Dakota House of Representatives
 William E. Merry, former member of the South Dakota House of Representatives
 John Mortvedt, soil scientist born and raised on a farm near Dell Rapids
Marsha Symens, member of the South Dakota Senate

References

Bibliography

External links

 City of Dell Rapids website
 Dell Rapids Tribune website

Cities in South Dakota
Cities in Minnehaha County, South Dakota
Sioux Falls, South Dakota metropolitan area